"Everything Is Beautiful" is a 1970 song by Ray Stevens.

Everything Is Beautiful may also refer to:
 Everything Is Beautiful (Ray Stevens album), 1970
 Everything Is Beautiful (Kurt Travis album), 2014
 Everything Is Beautiful (Princess Nokia album), 2020
 "Everything Is Beautiful", song by Kylie Minogue from Aphrodite

See also
 Everything Was Beautiful, a 2022 album by Spiritualized